The Philippine Savings Bank (shortened as PSBank or abbreviated as PSB) is a savings bank based in the Philippines.  It is a subsidiary of Metrobank and is the 2nd-largest savings bank in the Philippines after BPI Family Savings Bank.

Subsidiaries and affiliates

PSBank is a subsidiary of Metrobank, and as such is affiliated with it.  PSBank is also affiliated with Toyota Financial Services Philippines Corporation (TFSPC), where it currently has a 25% stake.

Ownership
Metropolitan Bank and Trust Company: 75.98%
PCD Nominee Corporation: 5.86%
Danilo L. Dolor (son of Doña Soledad Dolor): 5.04%
Erlinda L. Dolor: 2.95%
Ma. Soledad S. de Leon: 1.67%
Public stock: 4.01%

Competition
PSBank competes with other savings banks, such as BPI Family Savings Bank and RCBC Savings Bank. The bank is also competing against multinational savings bank such as Citibank Savings and HSBC Savings. However, since PSBank is considered a major bank, it also competes with bigger financial institutions.  It does not, however, aggressively compete with parent company Metrobank.

Controversies

Impeachment of Renato Corona
PSBank officials were about to receive a subpoena request in connection with the Impeachment of Renato Corona due to the allegations of a secret US$ account under the name of Renato Corona.

In addition, the PSBank executives were also asked to bring consumer identification and specimen signature card(s) of the bank account(s) under Corona's name which won P1 million in the PSBank Monthly Millions Raffle Promo.

Pork Barrel Case
During the senate investigations involving the Priority Development Assistance Fund scam, also known as the pork barrel scam, PSBank was one of the domestic Philippine banks included in the senate inquiry about the bank accounts of the whistleblowers.

Moreover, PSBank was also included as one of the banks from which Sen. Ramon Revilla Jr. and his family, as well as those of Janet Lim-Napoles and her pseudo-NGOs, have utilized to launder the controversial “pork barrel” funds.

See also

BancNet
Metropolitan Bank and Trust Company

References

External links
PSBank Official website

Banks of the Philippines
Companies listed on the Philippine Stock Exchange
Companies based in Makati